The Altus AVA is an American Viticultural Area located in the Arkansas River Valley in Arkansas near the town of Altus in Franklin County. The wine region is entirely contained within the Arkansas Mountain AVA, which is in turn contained within the larger multi-state Ozark Mountain AVA. The Altus region is a plateau above the Arkansas River to the south and below the Boston Mountains to the north. The soil is gravel and loam, with a high acidity.

References

External links 
  TTB AVA Map

American Viticultural Areas
Arkansas wine
Geography of Franklin County, Arkansas
1984 establishments in Arkansas